Ekaterina Alexandrova was the defending champion, but chose not to participate in 2021.

Alison Van Uytvanck won the title, defeating Ana Bogdan in the final, 6–2, 7–5.

Seeds

Draw

Finals

Top half

Bottom half

Qualifying

Seeds

Qualifiers

Qualifying draw

First qualifier

Second qualifier

Third qualifier

Fourth qualifier

References

External links
Main Draw
Qualifying Draw

Open de Limoges - Singles
Open de Limoges